Mount Wodzicki is the highest peak (2,380 m) on the ridge between Mount Jamroga and Helix Pass in the central portion of the Bowers Mountains. Named by the New Zealand Antarctic Place-Names Committee (NZ-APC) after Antoni Jontek Wodzicki, New Zealand Antarctic Research Program (NZARP) geologist who climbed and studied the geology of this peak in the 1974–75 season.

Mountains of Victoria Land
Pennell Coast